Hisseine Abana (born 25 June 1983) is a former Chadian professional football player. He made 15 appearances for the Chad national football team.

Career 
Abana started his career in Chadian club Renaissance. He later moved to France, and played for FC Petit Bard in Montpellier.

Abana made his first appearance for the Chad on 25 September 1997, in a match against Bahrain, in a friendly international football tournament  held in Tripoli, Libya. He scored his first goal for the national team against Congo on 2 August 1998. He scored his other 2 goals on UNIFAC Cup in 1999 in Gabon. He played 15 matches total for the national team.

See also
 List of Chad international footballers

References

External links
 

1983 births
Living people
Chadian footballers
Chad international footballers
Association football forwards